Gory is a rural commune and small town in the Cercle of Yélimané in the Kayes Region of western Mali, near the border of Mauritania. The commune contains the following ten villages: Biladjimi, Chiguegué, Darsalam, Foungou, Gory, Gory Banda, Mongoro, Sabouciré, Sambancanou and Takoutallah. In the 2009 census the commune had a population of 10,760. The town of Gory is 25 km west of the town of Yélimané.

References

External links
.

Communes of Kayes Region